The Isle of Man Act 1958 restated the Common Purse Agreement between the United Kingdom and the Isle of Man.

It also ended control by the UK Treasury over Manx finances, and granted Tynwald powers to legislate with regard to customs, harbours, loans, mines, the police and the civil service.

The entire Act was repealed and replaced by the Isle of Man Act 1979.

References

External links
 Second Reading of the Isle of Man Bill 1958 from Hansard (TheyWorkForYou)

Manx law
United Kingdom Acts of Parliament 1958
Acts of the Parliament of the United Kingdom concerning the Isle of Man
Repealed United Kingdom Acts of Parliament